Carsten Köhrbrück (born 19 November 1967 in Dortmund) is a retired German hurdler.

He won the bronze medal at the 1985 European Junior Championships. He won a silver medal in the 4 x 400 metres relay at the 1990 European Championships, with teammates Klaus Just, Edgar Itt and Norbert Dobeleit. He also finished sixth in the hurdles event. He later competed at the 1991 World Championships and the 1992 Summer Olympics without reaching the final.

His personal best time was 48.89 seconds, achieved in August 1990 in Düsseldorf. This ranks him seventh on the German all-time list, behind Harald Schmid, Olaf Hense, Edgar Itt, Uwe Ackermann, Thomas Goller and Volker Beck.

Köhrbrück represented the sports clubs OSC Berlin and LAC Halensee Berlin. He became German champion in 1990.

References

1967 births
Living people
German male hurdlers
Athletes (track and field) at the 1992 Summer Olympics
Olympic athletes of Germany
German athletics coaches
Sportspeople from Dortmund
European Athletics Championships medalists
Universiade medalists in athletics (track and field)
Universiade bronze medalists for West Germany
Medalists at the 1989 Summer Universiade